Richard Norman may refer to:

Richard Norman (chemist), British chemist
Richard Norman (philosopher), British academic, philosopher and humanist
Richard Norman, founder of movie production company Norman Studios in the U.S.
Dick Norman (American football) (Richard Michael Norman), American football quarterback

See also
Dick Norman, tennis player from Belgium
Rick Norman, Australian rules footballer